Pavlina may refer to:

Given name:
Pavlina Chilingirova (born 1955), Bulgarian chess player, Woman International Master (WIM, 1982)
Pavlina Evro (born 1965), retired Albanian mid-distance and long-distance runner
Pavlina Filipova (born 1975), Bulgarian biathlete
Pavlina Hoti, member of the Assembly of the Republic of Albania for the Democratic Party of Albania
Pavlina Jobankova (born 1973), Czechoslovak-Czech sprint canoeist
Pavlina Khristova (born 1968), Bulgarian rower
Pavlina Nemcova (born 1973), Czech model, actress and producer
Pavlina Nikaj (1931–2011), Albanian singer
Pavlina Nola (born 1974), former tennis player who played for both Bulgaria and New Zealand
Pavlina Osta (born 1997), American radio personality and Executive Producer for Salem Media Group
Pavlina Pajk (1854–1901), early Slovene poet, novelist, essay writer and biographer
Pavlina Porizkova (born 1965), Czech-born Swedish supermodel, actress, author and feminist
Pavlina Scasna (born 1982), Czech former football striker
Pavlina Sulcova (born 1986), road cyclist from the Czech Republic
Pavlina R. Tcherneva, American economist of Bulgarian descent, director of the Economics program at Bard College

Surname:
Evgenia Pavlina (born 1978), former Belarusian rhythmic gymnast who competed as an individual
Steve Pavlina (born 1971), American self-help author, motivational speaker and entrepreneur

See also

Paulina